DeFRaG (also capitalised as defrag, abbreviated as df, and its name comes from « Défis Fragdome ») is a free software modification for id Software's first-person shooter computer game Quake III Arena (Q3A). The mod is dedicated to player movements and trickjumping. It aims at providing a platform for self-training, competition, online tricking, machinima making, and trickjumping. Hence it constitutes an exception among other Q3A mods.

The mod includes a variety of features—timers and meters, ghost mode, cheat prevention and learning tools. Specially designed maps are provided that will rely on the player's movement abilities to be completed up to the finish line, while standard Q3A maps and Capture the Flag (CTF) fast captures are supported as well. Furthermore gamespace physics from both the original Q3A and the Challenge ProMode Arena (CPMA) mod are supported.

The modification was released to the public in ca. September–October 2000. In 2002 DeFRaG was selected as "Mod of the Week" at Planet Quake.

Overview 

DeFRaG was initially designed for making possible a new kind of competition based on timed runs. Those competitions called "DeFRaG runs" differ from common speedruns in several ways. Unlike speedruns, DeFRaG runs are not done in maps from an out-of-the-box original game, but in specially designed and customed DeFRaG maps, and there are no opponents to be vanquished during the run. Because of their design many of these maps cannot be completed by normal player skills; rather trickjumping skills are indispensable. Furthermore start-, checkpoints-, and stop-triggers are built into the maps. As a proof of the accomplishment the mod automatically records a demo of every map completed successfully. Along with the demo, the precise time in which the map was completed is stored.

Competition and community 
The mod's competitive method is lent to it by an online infrastructure which has triggered the formation of a transnational community. Players download custom-designed maps (more than 16000 DeFRaG maps are available) and aim to complete the map's objectives in the shortest time possible. The best times can be submitted to online high score tables, which are keeping track of the fastest times for particular maps. These online scoreboards can be global or encompass certain regions only. During the mod's highest popularity, the DeFRaG development team periodically released new map packs, containing a number of officially sanctioned maps. These are generally the only maps on which times are accepted for the official website high score tables. In consequence the DeFraG community's individual members engage and specialize in one or more different practices: trickjumping itself, movie making, map making, coding, maintaining websites, portals (for interaction and as archives for maps and movies), and online scoreboards.

Violence 
The DeFRaG modification completely removes violence (except for the ability of the player to explode into bloody chunks) from the otherwise visceral first-person shooter. The gameplay mode or discipline called "deathmatch" came of age with Doom and was also in Q3A, the latter being dedicated to multiplayer competition. From these games electronic sports, and particularly its professional variant emerged. The same games drove the computer games and violence controversy to unprecedented heights. While the Doom series was heavily criticized for its gory content, the problem with Q3A was seen to be its focus on deathmatch, because in this discipline the ultimate objective is to kill ("frag"), as many other players as possible. But in DeFRaG's  gameplay modes killing opponents has no place whatsoever. DeFRaG gameplay is all about improving the skills to exploit the peculiarities of the Q3A physics in order to move faster, to navigate along courses through the map topographies formerly deemed to be impossible, or to perform moves as yet unseen. In consequence, the in-game weapons are no more regarded as instruments of destruction. Rather DeFRaG players use them as tools for moving around gamespace. This transformation of a first-person shooter into a vehicle for "virtual gymnastics" meanwhile has gradually been recognized by mainstream media. It is thrown into the public discourse as a counterweight to the stereotype of computer games fostering violent behaviour. The DeFRaG mod stars prominently in this.

Movie making 
The high-skill requirement of the game, along with the fast pace, cause that game movies are often made using content created by playing DeFRaG game modes. Within the community's tradition, especially the fastest runs, difficult trickjumping techniques are included in sequence. The DeFRaG demo-playback system includes settings to view the primary player from various angles and perspectives. This is in line with the history of the machinima phenomenon which originates from the speedrun community of Quake, the first game in the series. By following the argumentation of Stanford historian of science and technology Henry Lowood, DeFRaG can be called an instance of transformative high-performance play.

Some of these movies won gaming industry awards. For instance the freestyle trickjumping movie Tricking iT2 by Jethro Brewin "jrb" won five Golden Llamas Awards in 2004. The categories were: Best Picture, Best Audio, Best Tech, Best Editing and Direction, and Best Quake Movie. In the following year the trick-stunt movie Reaching Aural Nirvana by "mrks" won a Golden Llamas Award in the category Best Audio. Also in 2005 the art-house short movie defragged directed by Margit Nobis, an instance of Q3A machinima (its name is borrowed from the DeFRaG mod) was shown at numerous prestigious festivals, including the Vienna Independent Shorts festival.

Gameplay 

All maps share the common objective of finishing in the fastest time possible, but there are variations on how this is achieved. Run mode is a flat-out race which the objective is to finish line. In accuracy mode, map is completed after a certain number of targets have been hit with the railgun (a Q3A sniper rifle). Level mode is similar to run, but map provide a number of alternative ways of reaching the finish line. In fast caps mode, the time is measured since the flag has been taken. Training mode usually requires the successful usage of a particular technique in order to complete the level. There also "freestyle" maps without primary objective, but where the player may practise particular techniques. The type of map can usually be seen in its name, although some do not follow this convention.

There are two game physics and ruleset modes—Vanilla Quake 3 (VQ3) and Challenge ProMode (CPM). VQ3 is an original Q3A physics and game ruleset; CPM is an altered game physics delivered from Challenge ProMode Arena modification. It provides a gamemode which includes physics allowing for better air-control, rebalanced weapons, fast weapon switching and improvements of jumping techniques.

Techniques 
The completion of a DeFRaG map requires the use of a variety of trickjumping techniques. Most Training maps involve only one or two methods, but some more complicated Run and Level maps can require any number. Various map sections can require quick timing, combination, and flawless execution of several techniques.

Jumping techniques 
Jumping techniques allows a player to move faster, farther and/or jump higher. The most common techniques included in Q3A and DeFRaG itself includes bunny hopping, air strafing, strafe-jumping, circle-jumping, ramp-jumping, etc.

Bunny-hopping is the most basic method of yikes fast movement in which player is jumping repeatedly instead of running in order to move faster. Strafe-jumping (SJ) is a technique necessary to complete the majority of DeFRaG maps, and is considered to be the most fundamental technique in trick jumping. It is only possible because of a specificity of the game's physics unintentionally allowing moving vectors to add up to greater acceleration. Basically, no matter if the player's character is moving on the ground (running) or is airborne (jumping), the game engine always strives to limit its speed. However, already in the original Quake it was discovered that by non-trivial timed sequences of striking the direction keys (involving moving sideways, "strafing" in gamer language) and movements of the mouse, this limitation of speed could be overcome. As the Quake engines are the basis of many games, the possibility of strafe jumping is existing within other games, too. But Q3A's trickjumping community developed several distinct sub-techniques including single-beat strafe-jumping, single-beat strafe-jumping with airchange, double-beat strafe-jumping, half-beat strafe-jumping, and inverted strafe-jumping. The DeFRaG mod includes a helping tool, the Camping Gaz Head-Up Display (CGazHUD), which provides conveniently graphically formatted real-time feedback on acceleration and angles involved.

Circle-jumping (CJ) is based on the same principles as strafe-jumping; circle-jumping more often than not is used as the starting technique for a strafe-jumping run. Another technique involves ramped surfaces and it's called ramp-jumping; jumping on a ramped surface gives a height boost.
Air strafing can be done when the player is in the air, simply keeping him-/herself aligned at the optimal angle in relation to where the player wants to go, making the player go farther and faster whilst airborne; one of the methods for reaching difficult places.

Weapon techniques 

Weapon-jumping techniques requires the player jumps off the ground and, by using the proper weapon, immediately afterwards fires a bullet (rocket, grenade, plasma or BFG plasma) onto the spot on the floor exactly or very near beneath her/him. The damage of the resulting blast delivers momentum to the player's character and propels her/him higher into the air than possible by regular jumping. The gain in momentum can be used for vertical, horizontal, and diagonal movement. In Q3A four weapons makes self-splash damage and can be combined with each other—rocket and grenade launcher, BFG10K and plasma gun.

Rocket-jumping (RJ) is the only tricking technique using a weapon that can commonly be observed in Q3A professional deathmatch competition—in spite of the resulting cost in health with self-inflicting splash damage enabled in this game mode. Depending on the size and topography of the map and proper synchronisation, two or larger number of rockets can be timed to impact on the very same spot a fraction of a second or n-th after the player arrives there. Thus the player can capitalize on the added momentum furnished by the detonation of multiple projectiles, accelerate substantially and travel long distances airborne. When playing in DeFRaG's multiplayer mode, projectiles fired by other players can be used as well.

Grenade-jumping (GJ) is a technique which demands more exacting timing, because the grenade-launcher's projectile ricochets after it is launched, and its detonation is delayed. Combining more than one grenade in order to make GJ is also possible but may require more players due to detonation delay. BFG-jumping is a technique kin to rocket-jumping, and only insofar different as the BFG has a higher rate of fire and makes more splash damage. Plasma-jumping, also called plasma-hopping, is a technique in which plasma gives slight boost to the jump.

Team tricking weapon-jumpings requires teamwork with minimum one additional player. In DeFRaG every weapon can be used in this technique; the other player's weapon may deliver additional momentum. Most common team techniques includes gauntlet-, rocket-, grenade- and rail-jumping.

The plasma gun can be used to climb along walls (a technique called plasma-climbing). The vertical climb is the most basic variant. The successive recoil of the gun's rapid fire then lifts the player up the wall. By various combinations of direction-keys and mouselook horizontal and diagonal paths are possible as well. Expert performers can change the directions of travel en route, climb down and up again, climb along curved walls, and hit high walls from mid-air to plasma-climb in any direction.

Techniques exploiting bugs 
Techniques exploiting bugs capitalize on flaws in the game engine which in some maps lend special qualities to certain locations resulting in Q3A physics anomalies.

If at particular spots the player falls from a certain height to the ground, they will be catapulted up again, although no jumppad is present (the technique is named overbounce). Overbounces can be combined with weapon techniques. The DeFRaG mod includes an "overbounce detector", a tool that helps the player to identify locations in maps where an overbounce is possible. A variety of overbounce opportunities has been discovered, made into techniques, and have been named accordingly: vertical, horizontal, sticky, diagonal ("weird"), zero-ups diagonal, and slippery diagonal overbounce.

At certain locations when a player steps near a wall and jumps to it she/he will end up "sticking" to the wall in mid-air. Now the player can perform a speed-gaining technique like strafe-jumping without her/his character moving from the spot, but "accelerating" nevertheless. This is a real anomaly as the player character does not move in gamespace, but the game engine ascribes ever higher speed to it. The player then can "unstick" from the wall by firing a splash damage weapon into it, and subsequently will move with the speed gained "on the spot". This technique is called "sticky wall" or "rebounce".

Notes

References

External links
 DeFRaG download
 Q3DF.ORG—Community
 Former official website (cggdev.org) [2008-2011] at Internet Archive Wayback Machine
 Former official website (defraggers.free.fr) [2003-2006] at Internet Archive Wayback Machine
 Quake 3 DeFRaG Center: Breakdown-HQ Former community website
 Arenas Episode 5: DeFrag—A machinima movie about DeFRaG

2000 video games
Esports games
First-person shooters
Open-source video games
Linux games
MacOS games
Multiplayer online games
Quake III Arena mods
Windows games